The J. Leo Fairbanks House is a historic residence in Corvallis, Oregon, United States.

It was listed on the National Register of Historic Places in 1985.

See also
National Register of Historic Places listings in Benton County, Oregon

References

External links

1926 establishments in Oregon
Individually listed contributing properties to historic districts on the National Register in Oregon
Houses completed in 1926
Houses in Corvallis, Oregon
Houses on the National Register of Historic Places in Oregon
National Register of Historic Places in Benton County, Oregon